Maria Angela Kahaʻawelani Beckley Kahea (December 23, 1847 – July 11, 1909) was a high chiefess during the Hawaiian Kingdom. She was a granddaughter of Captain George Charles Beckley and High Chiefess Ahia and a descendant of High Chief Hoʻolulu, who helped conceal the bones of Kamehameha I. During her youth, she served as lady-in-waiting in the courts of Queen Emma and Queen Kapiʻolani. She was appointed kahu (keeper or caretaker) of the Royal Mausoleum of Hawaii at Mauna ʻAla in 1893 and served in this position until her death.

Family 
Born on December 23, 1847, she was the only daughter and second child of Hawaiian chiefess Kahinu and William Charles Malulani Kaleipaihala Beckley (1814–1871). Her brothers were Frederick William Kahapula Beckley Sr. (1845–1881), who was Governor of Kauaʻi under King Kalākaua, and George Charles Moʻoheau Beckley (1849–1910), a ship captain. Her family was of the aliʻi (nobility) class and traced their descent to King Kahekili II of Maui and King Līloa of Hawaii. Her father was one of the sons of Captain George Charles Beckley, a British sea captain and advisor of King Kamehameha I, who married the High Chiefess Ahia. Her mother Kahinu was the daughter of the High Chief Hoʻolulu who, along with his brother Hoapili, helped conceal the iwi (bones) of King Kamehameha I in a secret hiding place after his death. Her Hawaiian name Kahaʻawelani means "carrying the heavenly one" and honored her grandfather Hoʻolulu who carried the iwi of Kamehameha to his secret burial place.

Court life and service as kahu 
During the reign of King Kamehameha V (r. 1863–1872), she served as lady-in-waiting to Queen Dowager Emma, the widow of King Kamehameha IV. After King Kalākaua was elected as monarch in 1874, he sent for Kahea to join his court. On learning of this, Queen Emma asked Kahea to accept the request and to become be lady-in-waiting to Kalākaua's wife Queen Kapiʻolani. Kalākaua reigned from 1874 to 1891 and was succeeded by his sister Queen Liliʻuokalani who reigned from 1891 to 1893. Around 1891, Kahea and Hawaiian musician Lizzie Alohikea co-composed the song Ahi Wela which consist of "poetry of passion, telling of sexual combustion that may result from the act of love".

On March 24, 1893, two months after the overthrow of the kingdom and the deposition of Queen Liliʻuokalani, Minister of Interior James A. King appointed Kahea and her husband as kahu (caretaker or keeper) of the Royal Mausoleum of Hawaii at Mauna ʻAla. They succeeded Princess Poʻomaikelani, a member of the deposed royal family and the sister of Queen Kapiʻolani in this post. On March 25, Liliʻuokalani wrote in her diary:

Kahea was the first member of the Hoʻolulu family line to serve as kahu of the Royal Mausoleum. The kuleana (responsibility) of this position has continued in her family and the descendants of her cousin Miriam Auhea Kekāuluohi Crowningburg up to the present-day. On November 30, 1894, the newspaper Hawaii Holomua Progress published a letter Kahea wrote to the editor of the newspaper. In the letter, she explained her connections to the interred monarchs and responded to a November 17 report by the paper that former retainers of King Kalākaua were refused access to the mausoleum on the occasion of the king's birthday on November 16.

Death and burial 
Kahea died at the Sanatorium in Honolulu on the evening of July 11, 1909, from the shock of a surgery for stomach cancer. Her funeral was held in the following afternoon from the Cathedral Basilica of Our Lady of Peace. Her service was attended by relatives, representatives of the old chiefly lines of Hawaii, and members of the Kaʻahumanu Society and the Cathedral was "packed to the very doors" with wellwishers. One of her pallbearers was Edward Kamakau Lilikalani. She was buried at the Oahu Cemetery beside other members of the Beckley family. She was succeeded as kahu by her husband David Kahea.

Marriage and children 

She married David Kaipeʻelua Kahea (1846–1921), a native of Maui and graduate of Lahainaluna School. They had a number of children including Leander Kaonowailani (1875–1938), Violet Kahaleluhi Kinoole (1877–1958), Grace Namahana i Kaleleokalani (1878–1899), Frederick Malulani (1882–1949), George Healii (1886–1921), and Benjamin Kameʻeiamoku (1892–1954). Frederick Malulani succeeded his parents as kahu of the Royal Mausoleum. George Healii served in the British Army and was a decorated war hero by King George V. Benjamin Kameʻeiamoku fought in the Canadian Army.

Notes

References

Bibliography

External links 

1847 births
1909 deaths
People from Hawaii (island)
Royal Mausoleum (Mauna ʻAla)
Native Hawaiian people
Hawaiian Kingdom people of English descent
Hawaiian nobility
Burials at Oahu Cemetery
Nobility of the Americas